Hri Kumar Nair   (born 16 June 1966) is a Singaporean lawyer and former politician who has been serving as Deputy Attorney-General of Singapore since 2017. A former member of the People's Action Party, he was the Member of Parliament representing the Thomson division of Bishan–Toa Payoh GRC between 2006 and 2015.

Education
Nair attended National Junior College before graduating from the National University of Singapore in 1991 with a Bachelor of Laws degree.

Legal career
Nair was called to the Singapore Bar in 1992. He joined Drew & Napier and became a director of the firm. He was appointed senior counsel in 2008.

Nair was appointed as the deputy attorney-general (DAG) for a three-year term starting on 1 March 2017, followed by another three-year term extension commencing on 1 March 2020. He has since resigned as a member of the People's Action Party as well as the director of Drew & Napier. He was the first ex-lawmaker in Singapore to take on the role of a public prosecutor.

Nair was involved with several high profile cases during his term as DAG, including the appeal of the City Harvest Church trial and Tan Cheng Bock's constitutional challenge to the elected presidency in 2017. Nair, in his capacity as the DAG representing the government, was criticised by Tan for his comments in the High Court. Nair was quoted to have said that Tan's motives "are purely selfish and he has shown no regard for the principle of multiracial representation which Parliament intended to safeguard".

In November 2017, Nair appeared before the Court of Appeal to argue against the acquittal of Mohd Ariffan Mohd Hassan, who was accused of raping his lover's daughter. The court dismissed the appeal, issuing a landmark judgment setting out the criteria for bringing in fresh evidence applying to the prosecution. In June 2018, Nair successfully argued the prosecution's appeal for the death sentence to be imposed on Chia Kee Chen, who murdered his wife's ex-lover Dexmon Chua. In 2019, Nair led the prosecution team during the trial of Leslie Khoo Kwee Hock, who strangled his girlfriend Cui Yajie near Gardens by the Bay and burned her body in what was known as the "Gardens by the Bay murder" case. Khoo was subsequently convicted of murder in July 2019, and the prosecution argued for him to be sentenced to life imprisonment, on the account that his actions did not warrant the death penalty since he did not exhibit any viciousness or blatant disregard for human life. The judge agreed, and imposed a life sentence on 19 August 2019. Khoo appealed against his conviction and sentence, but later withdrew it.

In September 2020, Nair was appointed to conduct a prosecutorial review for a wrongful conviction case of a domestic worker, Parti Liyani, who was wrongfully accused of theft.

Nair will begin serving as a Judge in the High Court from January 2, 2023, following his appointment by President Halimah Yacob

Political career
From 2006 to 2015, Nair was a member of parliament for Bishan–Toa Payoh GRC, holding the Thomson–Toa Payoh ward. He was once an advisor to the Bishan–Toa Payoh grassroots organisations. He was appointed chairman of the Bishan–Toa Payoh Town Council from 2011 to 2015. He was succeeded by Chong Kee Hiong and the head of the Government Parliamentary Committees for Home Affairs and Law.

Nair has spoken out in favour of the repeal of Section 377A of the Penal Code in Singapore, which criminalises homosexual sex. He is known for criticising the opposition for not taking a stand on contentious issues and for his criticisms of the Worker's Party's management of the Aljunied–Hougang Town Council.

Nair retired from politics before the 2015 Singaporean general election, citing his wife’s diagnosis of lymphoma in 2012 as a factor.

Directorships
Nair has held several directorships.
 People’s Association Board of Management (1 January 2007 – 31 May 2011)
 Bishan EC Pte Ltd (11 September 2008 – 21 February 2012)
 Riviera Properties Pte. Ltd. (23 August 2006 – 13 September 2012)
 NTUC Choice Homes Co-Operative Ltd (23 August 2006 – 13 September 2012)
 Media Development Authority of Singapore (1 January 2007 – 31 December 2012)
 NTUC Foodfare Co-operative Ltd (21 September 2012 – 25 May 2015)
 NTUC Income (3 September 2015 – 2017)

Personal life
Nair is the youngest of nine children in his family. His first name is pronounced and was originally intended to be spelt as "Hari"; the current spelling is a result of a typing error in the original copy of his birth certificate that was never rectified. His wife is a partner of Ernst & Young. His only child, a daughter, was born in 2006 or 2007.

References

External links
 Hri Kumar Nair's CV on the Attorney-General's Chambers website

21st-century Singaporean lawyers
Singaporean legal officers
Singaporean Senior Counsel
Members of the Parliament of Singapore
People's Action Party politicians
National University of Singapore alumni
Singaporean people of Indian descent
National Junior College alumni
Singaporean Hindus
Singaporean people of Malayali descent
Living people
1966 births
Singaporean politicians of Indian descent